Grease monkey may refer to:
 Grease monkey, a slang term for a mechanic
 Grease Monkey (business), a franchised chain of automotive service centers
 Greasemonkey, an extension for Mozilla Firefox
 Grease Monkey, a comic
 Grease monkey, a slang term for a slightly built burglar with entry skills.
 Grease monkey, a term for a competition similar to a Pig wrestling competition, but using a lubricated monkey.